Compher is a surname. Notable people with the surname include:
 J. T. Compher (born 1995), American ice hockey player
 Jesse Compher (born 1999), American ice hockey player